Wayne Snow Jr. (January 10, 1936 – September 28, 2004) was an American politician. He served as a Democratic member for the 1-1 and 1-3 district of the Georgia House of Representatives.

Life and career 
Snow was born in Davidson County, Tennessee. He attended LaFayette High School and the University of Georgia.

In 1963, Snow was elected to the Georgia House of Representatives. In 1965, he was elected as the first representative for the newly-established 1-3 district. He was also elected to the 1-1 district, serving until 1983, when he was succeeded by Donald F. Oliver.

Snow died in September 2004 from complications of diabetes, at the age of 68.

References 

1936 births
2004 deaths
People from Davidson County, Tennessee
Democratic Party members of the Georgia House of Representatives
20th-century American politicians
University of Georgia alumni
Deaths from diabetes